Banpo-dong is a dong, neighborhood of Seocho-gu, the greater Gangnam area in Seoul, South Korea. Banpo-dong is divided into five different dong which are Banpobon-dong, Banpo 1-dong, 2-dong, 3-dong and 4-dong.

The neighborhood is just north of Express Bus Terminal station and to the south of the Han River. Some of the apartment buildings were built in the late 1970s but the area is considered affluent due to its central location within Seoul, proximity to the Han River Park, shopping malls, and mass transit transportation options. This area is also specialized for education, since banpo-shopping-center contains numerous educational academies of the greater Gangnam area. Banpo is currently going on a constant re-modelling of the old apartments as well. Banpo is also famous for its French town which is called Seorae Village in the greater Gangnam area.

The area is home of Seorae Village, a small French enclave, with its large concentration of French residents and European-style restaurants, dessert cafés, as well as wineries and cafés stand along its main street.

The National Library of Korea is located in Banpo-dong. It was founded in 1945 in Sogong-dong, Jung-gu and was relocated to Banpo-dong in 1988.

Banpo Bridge is also located in the district.

Education 
 High Schools
 Banpo High School
 Sehwa High School
 Sehwa Girls' High School
 Sangmoon High School
 Seoul High School 
 Yangjae High School 
 Middle Schools
 Bangbae Middle School
 Banpo Middle School
 Hangang Middle School
 Sehwa Women's Middle School
 Sinbanpo Middle School
 Wonchon Middle School
 Elementary Schools
 Banpo Elementary School
 Banwon Elementary School
 Gyeseong Elementary School
 Jamwon Elementary School
 Seowon Elementary School
 Wonchon Elementary School
 International schools
 French School of Seoul (Seorae Village)
 Dulwich College Seoul

Transportation
 Banpo Station of 
 Nonhyeon Station of 
 Sinbanpo Station of 
 Gubanpo Station of 
 Sapyeong Station of 
 Sinnonhyeon Station of 
 Express bus terminal

Hospital 

 Catholic university Seoul-Sungmo hospital
 Catholic university Seoul-Sungmo medication center
 Yonsei kids dentist office
 Hanul department of ophthalmology
 H plastic surgery center

Police office 

 Seoul Seocho police office
 Banpo public peace center

Park 

 Banpo Han river park
 Banpo Jangmi Park
 Shin Banpo Park
 Montmartre Park

Apartment 

 Banpo XI
 Banpo Raemian Firstige
 Banpo Riche

Festival 

 Banpo firework festival
 Banpo hanbul music festival
 Seoul Bamdokkaebi Night Market

Library 

 National library of Korea
 Seocho Gu Rip Banpo library

Bridge 

 Banpo bridge
 Banpo bridge rainbow fountain
 Nueu bride

See also 
Administrative divisions of South Korea

References

External links
Seocho-gu official website
Seocho-gu map at the Seocho-gu official website
 The Banpo 1-dong Resident office

Neighbourhoods of Seocho District